The Danish American Football Federation (DAFF; Danish: Dansk Amerikansk Fodbold Forbund) is an American football organization in Denmark founded in 1988. Its headquarters are located in Brøndby. DAFF organizes Denmark's national American football team, which competes in the International Federation of American Football.

Since 2000, DAFF has seen a huge increase in membership, influenced by Danish television station TV2 Zulu broadcasts of National Football League (NFL) games on Sunday evenings. The sudden popularity of the sport in Denmark has been dubbed "the Zulu effect" after the name of the TV station. As of the 2007 season, Viasat obtained the rights to broadcast the NFL in Denmark on both 3+ and TV 2 Sport (Viasat owns 49 percent of TV 2 Sport).

The popularity of American football in Denmark can also be attributed to the nation's interest in the long career of Danish placekicker Morten Andersen, the NFL's all-time leader in points.

National League teams

Danish American Football Federation Hall of Fame
DAFF opened the Danish American Football Federation Hall of Fame on February 5, 2006, the day of Super Bowl XL.

Players
 Morten Andersen (Inducted 2006) - First Dane in NFL. Former kicker for New Orleans Saints, Atlanta Falcons, New York Giants, Kansas City Chiefs and Minnesota Vikings.
 Michael Boed (2006) - Quarterback, Receiver, Kicker for Copenhagen Vikings and Copenhagen Towers
 Morten Hertz (2008) - Odense Swans, Aarhus Tigers, Copenhagen Towers and Kronborg Knights
 Robert Nederby (2006) - Receiver, Quarterback, Runningback, Linebacker, Cornerback for Herning Hawks, Aarhus Tigers
 Alexander Littau (2009) - Safety, Cornerback for Aarhus Tigers, Odense Swans
 Peter Overlade (2008)- Roskilde Kings
 Allan Pedersen (2006) - Lineman for Victoria Dolphins (Canada), Odense Swans, Kronborg Knights, Copenhagen Towers, Hvidovre Blackfoots
 Jens Bo Poulsen (2006) - Receiver, Runningback for Copenhagen Vikings, Copenhagen Towers
 Michael Weien (2007) - Linebacker/running back for Odense Swans, Aarhus Tigers, and Viby Troopers

Coaches
 Ron Da Costa (Inducted 2006) for Copenhagen Vikings, Roskilde Kings, Kronborg Knights, Herlev Rebels, Vestegnen Volunteers.
 John Lawson (2007) for Roskilde Kings, Aarhus Tigers, Herning Hawks. Appeared in five consecutive Mermaid Bowls with an overall 5-1 Mermaid Bowl record
 John Martinko (2006) for Copenhagen Towers.

Contributors
 Jimmy Bøjgaard (Inducted 2007) - play-by-play commentator with Claus Elming through 7 years on Zulu.
 Claus Elming (2006) - Color commentator for NFL on Denmark's TV2 Zulu. Also a coach for Avedøre Monarchs and Wide receiver for Herning Hawks and Aarhus Tigers also a founder of Aarhus Tigers.
 Torben Elming (2006) - Chairman of the Danish American Football Federation
 Menno Hilverdink (2006) - Started American Football in Denmark - Copenhagen Vikings
 Agnar Nielsen (2006) - Executive of Danish American Football Federation
 Tommy Terp (2006) - Executive of Esbjerg Hurricanes

References

External links
 DAFF's homepage (in Danish)
 Copenhagen Post article about the growing popularity of American football in Denmark
 The official website of the Copenhagen Towers

American football governing bodies in Europe
American Football
American football in Denmark